Sohrab Uddin may refer to:

 Sohrab Uddin- is a Bangladesh Nationalist Party politician and the former Member of Parliament from Kushtia-3.
 Suhrab Uddin- is a Bangladesh Awami League politician and the incumbent Member of Parliament from Kishoreganj-2.
 Surabuddin Mollick- is an Indian footballer. 
 Death of Sohrabuddin Sheikh